Postal codes in Nepal are five digit numbers used by Nepal Postal Service, The postal code system was implemented in November 1991 by the Department of Posts. Each district has a unique combination of two letters and the last three digits, representing the post office or APO area, according to its geographical coordinates. The first two letters represent the geographical district area.

See also 
 Telephone numbers in Nepal
 List of districts of Nepal

External links 
 "Nepal Postal Code"

References 

Nepal
Postal system of Nepal